Medway was launched at Fort William, Calcutta in 1801. She immediately sailed to Britain under charter to the British East India Company (EIC). There her owners sold her. She traded with Madeira and the Americas before she foundered in 1812.

Career
Captain William Brabazon sailed from Calcutta on 6 September 1801. Medway was at Culpee on 18 September, reached Saint Helena on 3 January 1802, and arrived at The Downs on 25 March.

Medway arrived at London on the 30th with a cargo of rice. The sale of Georgianas rice was to follow the sale that day of 27,000 bags of rice for the EIC's account that the East Indiamen , Cornwallis, Medway, and  had brought.

Medway was admitted to the Registry of Great Britain 24 September 1802. She was sold in London.

She appears in the 1802 issue of Lloyd's Register with W. Potts, master, Youille & Co., owner, and trade London–Madeira.

On 25 March 1803 Lloyd's List reported that Medway, Potts, master, had put into New London after having been struck by lightning. She had been sailing from New York to Madeira at the time of the strike.

Gales in February 1808 caused Medway, Potts, master, to lose an anchor and cables at Margate while sailing from London to Madeira.

Around 1808-9 Medways master changed to W. Watson, her owner changed to Middleton, and her trade to London–Rio de Janeiro.

The Register of Shipping for 1813 shows Medways master as Pricket, and her trade still as London–Rio de Janeiro.

Fate
Her crew arrived three days later at Gonsalves in their boats.

Citations and references
Citations

References

 
Select Committee on Petitions Relating to East-India-Built Shipping, House of Commons, Parliament of Great Britain (1814) Minutes of the Evidence Taken Before the Select Committee of the House of Commons on Petitions Relating to East-India-built Shipping. (His Majesty's Stationery Office).

1801 ships
British ships built in India
Ships of the British East India Company
Maritime incidents in 1812